Khas Khus is a Nepali comedy web series which aired online on Aama Agni Kumari Media channel of YouTube. The lead actors of the show were played by the well-known Nepali comedians who were also writers and directors of this show, Kedar Ghimire and Wilson Bikram Rai. The show started on November 2, 2015, and the new episode of the show was uploaded every Thursday.

Synopsis
It is the story of life in the village, and what the villagers do in their daily lives. Wilson Bikram Rai played as Takme Budo, the retired soldier who was awarded Victoria Cross (VC) in World War 2 while fighting against Japan; he is a very talkative man, and he always likes to tell people how he got his VC and what he did in the military. He mostly tells them fake stories which are always very funny. He also played another role, which was called Hakim Sab, the richest man in the village, who always like to say "hudaina, hudaina" which means "no, no". Even though he is rich, he is a miser old man who thinks a lot even when he has to spend very little amount of money. Kedar Ghimire played as Magne Budho, which is his all-time most popular role; he also played other various roles. All the other actors had their own unique and funny roles as well. Story provided a new moral message in every episode.

Cast
Kedar Ghimire as Magne Budho
Wilson Bikram Rai as Takme Budo and Hakim Sab
Sandesh Lamichane as Batare Kancho
Sunita Gautam as Muiya
Niru Khadka as Nirmali/Dambari
Yaman Shrestha as Mana Maadsaab
Sita Ghimire as Sita Didi

References

External links 

 Aama Agni Kumar Media on YouTube

Comedy web series
Nepalese television series
2015 Nepalese television series debuts